Daniel Thambyrajah Niles (4 May 1908 – 17 July 1970) was a Ceylonese pastor, evangelist and president of the Ceylon Methodist Conference.

Early life and family
Niles was born on 4 May 1908 in Tellippalai in northern Ceylon. He was the son of district judge W. D. Niles and Rani Muthamma. He was educated at Jaffna Central College. After school he received theological training at United Theological College, Bangalore between 1920 and 1933.

Mailvaganam married Dulcie Solomons in 1935. They had two sons (Preman and Wesley Dayalan).

Career
After returning to Ceylon, Niles taught at Jaffna Central College until 1936. He was then ordained as a priest and became District Evangelist for the North District of the Methodist Church of Ceylon.

Niles became general secretary of the National Christian Council of Ceylon. He was chairman of the Youth Department of the World Council of Churches between 1948 and 1952. He was appointed Executive Secretary of the Department of Evangelism in the World Council of Churches in 1953. He also served as chairman of the World Student Christian Federation. He was general secretary and later chairman of the East Asian Christian Conference. He was also one of the presidents of the World Council of Churches.

Niles was pastor of the Methodist Church in Point Pedro (1946–50); pastor at Maradana (1950–53); principal of Jaffna Central College (1956–62); and superintendent minister at St. Peter's Church, Jaffna (1953–59). He was elected chairman of the North Ceylon Synod and president of the Ceylon Methodist Conference in 1964. Niles wrote the hymn "The Great love of God is revealed in the Son".

Niles was also known as an author of many theological books such as:

We Know in Part (1964)

The Preacher’s Calling to be Servant (1959)

The Preacher’s Task and the Stone of Stumbling (1958)

As Seeing the Invisible – A Study of the Book of Revelation (1961)

The Power at Work Among Us (1968)

In the Beginning – Biblical Essays Based on the Book of Genesis (1958)

Reading the Bible To-Day (1955)

Who is This Jesus 

Whereof We are Witnesses (1965)

Upon the Earth: The Mission of God and Missionary Enterprise of the Churches (1962)

Preaching the Gospel of the Resurrection (1953)

Living With the Gospel (1957)

That They May Have Life (1951)

What’s Life For: That They May See (1968)

The Power at Work Among Us – Meditations For Lent (1967)

Arguably his most famous quote "Evangelism is simply one beggar telling another beggar where to find the bread" comes from his book "That They May Have Life".

Death
Niles died on 17 July 1970.

References

1908 births
1970 deaths
Alumni of Jaffna Central College
People from Northern Province, Sri Lanka
Faculty of Jaffna Central College
Heads of schools in Sri Lanka
Sri Lankan Methodists
Sri Lankan Tamil priests
Sri Lankan Tamil teachers